Lasionycta frigida is a moth of the family Noctuidae. It has a restricted range in the Alberta Rocky Mountains. It is possibly also present in Yukon and Alaska.

The habitat is mixed forest in cold microclimates.

The wingspan is 26 mm for males and 27 mm for females. Adults are on wing in mid-July.

External links
A Revision of Lasionycta Aurivillius (Lepidoptera, Noctuidae) for North America and notes on Eurasian species, with descriptions of 17 new species, 6 new subspecies, a new genus, and two new species of Tricholita Grote

Lasionycta